Prionapteryx rubricalis is a moth in the family Crambidae. It is found in Nigeria.

References

Endemic fauna of Nigeria
Ancylolomiini
Moths described in 1919